Trilogy: Conflict, Climax, Resolution is the fourth studio album by the alternative hip hop group Souls of Mischief. The album was released via Hieroglyphics Imperium Recordings on October 24, 2000.

Critical reception
The A.V. Club wrote: "Consistent, irreverent, and imbued with an undercurrent of maturity and thoughtfulness, Trilogy proves that ... Souls of Mischief has found a way to thrive in major-label exile." (The New) Rolling Stone Album Guide wrote that Souls of Mischief "remain four great freestyle battlers without the musical gifts to craft great songs."

Track listing
"Intro"
"Trilogy" (Produced by Tommy Tee)
"Interrogation" (Produced by Domino)
"Last Night" (Produced by Jay-biz)
"Save the Babies (Conflict)"
"Bad Business" (Keyboards - Amp Fiddler)
"Danglin'" (Produced by Tommy Tee)
"Mama Knows Best"
"Medication"
"That Ain't Life (Climax)'
"4th Floor Freaks"
"Acupuncture"
"Fucked..."
"Soundscience" (Produced/Mixed By DJ Babu, Evidence)
"Supdoder (What's the Re?)"
"Airborne Ranger" (Produced by Phesto)
"Phoenix Rising (Resolution)"
"Enemy Mind"

Samples
"Intro"
"Scortch 3000 Years Later" by Andrew Belling
"Interrogation"
"Magnum Force" by Lalo Schifrin
"Medication"
"Mating Drive" by Lenny White
"Airborne Rangers"
"You" by A Taste of Honey

References

External links
 Trilogy: Conflict, Climax, Resolution Review at Discogs

2000 albums
Souls of Mischief albums